Asterodiscides belli is a species of starfish within the family Asterodiscididae. The species lives in waters off Seychelles and Somalia at depths of 22 to 40 meters.

References 

Animals described in 1977
Valvatida
Marine fauna of East Africa
Fauna of Seychelles
Fauna of the Indian Ocean